Haripal Kaushik, VrC (2 February 1934 – 25 January 2018) was an Indian field hockey player, military officer and television commentator.

Field hockey
He won gold medals in the 1956 Summer Olympics and the 1964 Summer Olympics. He was assistant captain of the team that won the gold medal in the 1966 Asian Games, and was later a field hockey administrator and television commentator. He received the Arjuna Award for excellence in athletic competition in 1998.

Military service
Commissioned into the Indian Army in 1959, Kaushik served in the 1st Battalion of the Sikh Regiment.

In the early days of the 1962 Sino-Indian War, Kaushik was commanding the forward company at the Battle of Bumla along the border between India and China when the Chinese People's Liberation Army invaded on 23 October. During heavy combat with much larger enemy forces, he led a successful retreat, saving the unit's heavy machine guns and mortars.

Kaushik was awarded the Vir Chakra for "exemplary courage and self-disregard" on the battlefield. He rose to the rank of lieutenant-colonel.

Haripal Stadium at the Indian Army's Mechanised Infantry Regimental Centre in Ahmednagar is named in his honor.

Vir Chakra
The citation for the Vir Chakra awarded to him reads:

Family and later years
He was married to Prem Bala Kaushik, who died before him. They had one daughter, Veronica. He died at his home in the Jalandhar cantonment, after suffering from dementia for several years.

References

External links
 
Braveheart and hockey wizard, farewell: Lt Col Haripal Kaushik was a rare combination of valour and sporting proficiency

1934 births
2018 deaths
Field hockey players from Jalandhar
Olympic field hockey players of India
Olympic gold medalists for India
Field hockey players at the 1956 Summer Olympics
Field hockey players at the 1964 Summer Olympics
Indian male field hockey players
Recipients of the Arjuna Award
Olympic medalists in field hockey
Asian Games medalists in field hockey
Field hockey players at the 1966 Asian Games
Medalists at the 1964 Summer Olympics
Medalists at the 1956 Summer Olympics
Deaths from dementia in India
Asian Games gold medalists for India
Medalists at the 1966 Asian Games